The Dodgeson was an automobile manufactured in Detroit, Michigan by Dodgeson Motors in 1926.  The Dodgeson was designed and engineered by John Duval Dodge, son of John Francis Dodge, one of the original Dodge Brothers.  The vehicle had a straight-8 rotary valve engine, with 3.2L of displacement, and produced  at 3,000 rpm.  The engine was supported by a four-point suspension system.

No production
Only prototypes were produced, and the series never saw production.

References
 

Defunct motor vehicle manufacturers of the United States
Motor vehicle manufacturers based in Michigan
Defunct companies based in Michigan